Transition metal complexes of aldehydes and ketones describes coordination complexes with aldehyde (RCHO) and ketone  ligands.  Because aldehydes and ketones are common, the area is of fundamental interest.  Some reactions that are useful in organic chemistry involve such complexes.

Structure and bonding

In monometallic complexes, aldehydes and ketones can bind to metals in either of two modes, η1-O-bonded and η2-C,O-bonded.  These bonding modes are sometimes referred to sigma- and pi-bonded. These forms may sometimes interconvert.

The sigma bonding mode is more common for higher valence, Lewis-acidic metal centers (e.g., Zn2+). The pi-bonded mode is observed for low valence, electron-rich metal centers (e.g., Fe(0) and Os(0)).

For the purpose of electron-counting, O-bonded ligands count as 2-electron "L ligands": they are Lewis bases.  η2-C,O ligands are described as analogues of alkene ligands, i.e. the Dewar-Chatt-Duncanson model.

η2-C,O ketones and aldehydes can function as bridging ligands, utilizing a lone pair of electrons on oxygen.

Related ligands
Related to η1-O-bonded complexes of aldehydes and ketones are metal acetylacetonates and related species, which can be viewed as a combination of ketone and enolate ligands.

Reactions

Some η2-aldehyde complexes insert alkenes to give five-membered metallacycles.

η1-Complexes of alpha-beta unsaturated carbonyls exhibit enhanced reactivity toward dienes.  This interaction is the basis of Lewis-acid catalyzed Diels-Alder reactions.

References

Organometallic chemistry
Transition metals
Coordination chemistry